Martin Hollstein (born 2 April 1987 in Neubrandenburg) is a German sprint canoer and Olympic champion. He has been competing since the late 2000s, mostly in kayak single, double or four.

At the 2008 Summer Olympics in Beijing Hollstein won the gold in the K-2 1000 m event with partner Andreas Ihle. At the 2012 Summer Olympics, he and Ihle won the Olympic bronze medal.

Hollstein also won a gold medal in the K-2 1000 m event at the 2010 ICF Canoe Sprint World Championships in Poznań and several European Championships.

Early life 
Hollstein, short "Holly", grew up in the German State of Mecklenburg-Vorpommern in the city of Neubrandenburg. There he joined the sports club SC Neubrandenburg in which he remains as a member to this day. His original trainer is Jürgen Lickfett. His first medal won Hollstein at the canoe state championships in Schwerin in the year 1998.

Hollstein startet in September 2005 an education as a mechanic at the Webasto AG company in his hometown Neubrandenburg. There he worked for three years but concentrated mainly on his career as a competitive athlete.

Professional career

2008 Summer Olympics 
In the national qualification for Olympic Games in 2008 Hollstein he paddled his way to fifth place and was called up to the national team.

At the decisive World Cup in Szeged, he finished fourth in the 500m double with Rupert Wagner, but that fell short of the norm as Olympic champions Ronald Rauhe and Tim Wieskötter won the race.

Shortly before the 2008 Summer Olympics, he surprisingly moved to the side of Andreas Ihle in the kayak double over 1000 meters for the ill Rupert Wagner. In a run-off, they were able to defeat Norman Zahm and Marcus Groß and thus secure participation in the Olympics. On the Olympic canoe course, the duo won the final and with that the Olympic gold medal.

For this success, Hollstein received the Silver Laurel Leaf award in November 2008, the highest state award for top performance in German sport, awarded by the then Federal President Horst Köhler.

World and European championships 
In 2010, Hollstein competed again with his double partner Andreas Ihle and won the gold medal at the 2010 European Canoe Racing Championships in Trasona.  In the same year, the team also won the gold medal at the 2010 World Championships in Poznań.

A year later, Hollstein won gold again at the 2011 European Canoe Racing Championships in Belgrade.  At the European Championships the following year in Zagreb, the canoeist took 2nd place.

2012 Summer Olympics 
At the 2012 Summer Olympics in London, he won the bronze medal in kayak double over 1000 m with Andreas Ihle.

Hollstein again received the Silver Laurel Leaf for this Olympic medal success. It was awarded by the Federal President Joachim Gauck at a ceremony in Bellevue Palace.

Injury 
In September 2013, Hollstein had to take an injury-related break due to a broken hand.  Despite his lack of training, the canoeist received a promise from the sports association that he would continue to receive maximum support, even if he missed out on the 2014 World Cup team due to injury.

After missing the finals at the European Championship 2014 in Brandenburg, intense training weeks followed for the four-man team around Hollstein with his partners Marius Radow, Martin Schubert and Kai Spenner.

In 2015 Hollstein had to undergo a surgery on his shoulder and had to take an injury-related break again.

End of active career 
The last major competition for Hollstein were the 2016 European Championships in Moscow.  There he competed under national coach Reiner Kießler. In the kayak double over 500 meters, the team took 4th place.

Federal Police and personal life 
In September 2009 he began training as a police officer at the German Federal Police. During his active career the police officer trainee was a member of the Kienbaum National Training Centre, the Federal Police's top sports promotion facility for summer and year-round sports.

He is currently working for the Federal Police at Berlin-Brandenburg Airport. Hollstein currently resides in Berlin and continues to compete privately in various competitions throughout Germany and internationally.

Awards 

 Awarded the Silver Laurel Leaf by Federal President Horst Köhler in 2008
 "Champion of the Year" 2008 Award at the Robinson Club in September 2008 in Agadir, Morocco
 Awarded the Silver Laurel Leaf by Federal President Joachim Gauck in November 2012 in Bellevue Palace
 Bronze star at the Walk of Sport in January 2022 in Neubrandenburg

Greatest competitions

References 

1987 births
Canoeists at the 2008 Summer Olympics
Canoeists at the 2012 Summer Olympics
German male canoeists
Living people
Olympic canoeists of Germany
Olympic gold medalists for Germany
Olympic medalists in canoeing
Olympic bronze medalists for Germany
ICF Canoe Sprint World Championships medalists in kayak
Medalists at the 2012 Summer Olympics
Medalists at the 2008 Summer Olympics
People from Neubrandenburg
Sportspeople from Mecklenburg-Western Pomerania